The  is the official state car used by the Prime Minister of Japan. 
 The current model is the Toyota Century, which was introduced in 2020 as the replacement of the Lexus LS.

Overview
The official car of the Prime Minister is armored with bulletproof glass and is covered in special steel armor. Vehicles of other members of the cabinet do not have extensive armoring, as gun laws in Japan are said to be one of the world's strictest. As for the Imperial family, the Emperor may travel in armored vehicles during times when there is a large crowd or during official duties.  Unlike the presidential state car of the United States, the official car of the Prime Minister is not driven by security agents, and is instead driven by a staff from the cabinet office, who also receives extensive driving training. A new driver is appointed for each Prime Minister, and the outgoing driver must resign together with the outgoing Prime Minister.

History
From 1921 to 1931, the Prime Minister used a Mercedes-Benz from then Japanese occupied Qingdao. In 1932, the official car changed to an armoured Lincoln, and that car was used by the next six Prime Ministers. However, Prime Minister Nobuyuki Abe was against using that vehicle, as he said "It was like riding in a tank". From then on, the Prime Minister's Official Car changed frequently between Buicks and Chryslers, as each Prime Minister had their own preference.

Since World War II, the Prime Minister's Official Car gradually changed from American vehicles to Japanese vehicles, as the country introduced its automotive industry development policy. From Prime Minister Nobusuke Kishi, the Nissan President, the Nissan Austin A50 Cambridge, and the Toyota Crown were used as the official car.

Following the Assassination of John F. Kennedy, the Japanese government changed the official vehicle to an armored Toyota Century. For the next 45 years, the Toyota Century was used as the official car due to its safety and comfort.

In 2008, the Japanese government changed the official car to the Lexus LS. In addition to having the same level of luxury and safety as the Toyota Century, the new Lexus LS had lower fuel consumptions and lower  emissions.

In 2020, the Japanese government picked the newest version Toyota Century as the Prime Minister's Official Car instead of the new Lexus LS.

References 

Individual cars
Vehicles of Japan
Prime Ministers of Japan